Bonavista, also known as Bona Vista, was a sailing ship built in 1825 at Sunderland. She was wrecked while on a voyage from Port Jackson to Isle of France (now Mauritius) upon Kenn Reef on 18 March 1828.

Career
Bonavista first appeared in Lloyd's Register (LR) in the volume for 1826.

She arrived at the Cape of Good Hope on 27 July, and sailed for Mauritius on 30 July. She arrived at Mauritius on 31 August.

Bonavista left Batavia on 19 December 1826 and arrived at Port Jackson on 18 February 1827. She left Port Jackson on 7 April for Isle of France (Mauritius). She arrived back in Port Jackson on 1 November from the Cape of Good Hope.

The two vessels separated that night. Captain Robert Towns, and his crew and passengers, spent eight weeks and six on the reef before , Thomas Stead, master, rescued them. Three crew men died, one when Bonavista wrecked and two during the rescue.

Citations and references

Citations

References
 

1825 ships
Ships built on the River Wear
Maritime incidents in March 1828
Shipwrecks of Queensland
Age of Sail merchant ships
Merchant ships of the United Kingdom